Marcus Fraser (born 26 July 1978) is an Australian professional golfer who plays on the European Tour, PGA Tour of Australasia and Asian Tour.

Career
Born in Corowa, New South Wales, Fraser spent his early years working at a supermarket. He completed a distinguished amateur career in 2002, finishing as the top individual in the Eisenhower Trophy world teams event.

He turned professional in 2002 and completed his first seasons playing on Europe's second tier Challenge Tour. In 2003, he won three tournaments in one month, the Danish Open, the Talma Finnish Challenge and the Russian Open, which was also a European Tour event. The last of those wins secured his card on the European Tour for 2004. He has maintained his playing status since by consistently finishing inside the top 120 on the Order of Merit, with a best of 25th place in 2012. Fraser has played in over 200 events on the European Tour and his best world ranking position was 51st. He is one of the shortest driving guys on Tour, averaging 271 yards off the tee in 2016.

On 25 April 2010, Fraser won the 2010 Ballantine's Championship with a closing 69 to finish four shots clear. Fraser claimed his first victory in seven years, completing a wire-to-wire win during a weather reduced 54 hole event.

In June 2012, Fraser lost out in a playoff to Danny Willett at the BMW International Open in Cologne. He led after a 64 during round one, but finished with a bogey on the 72nd hole to fall into a playoff. Fraser three-putted the fourth extra hole to lose the tournament when Willett made his chip and putt for par.

Fraser won his third European Tour title at the inaugural Maybank Championship Malaysia in February 2016. He capitalised on a late collapse by leader Lee Soo-min, who had led by two with three holes to play. He won by two strokes, as Lee dropped four strokes in his final three holes, to end a winless drought of almost six years, during which he played in 119 events.

He played in the first Olympic Golf Tournament since 1904 representing Australia with Scott Hend, due to the retirements of compatriots Jason Day, Adam Scott and Marc Leishman. After one round, he led the tournament, posting an 8-under-par 63, setting an Olympic record (tied by Matt Kuchar in the last day). Fraser shot a two-under 69 in the second round, holding the 36-hole lead. He had a bad weekend (72-72) but was still able to finish T5.

Amateur wins
1999 Victorian Amateur Championship
2001 Asia Pacific Championship
2002 New Zealand Amateur

Professional wins (7)

European Tour wins (3)

*Note: The 2010 Ballantine's Championship was shortened to 54 holes due to bad weather.
1Dual-ranking event with the Challenge Tour
2Co-sanctioned by the Asian Tour
3Co-sanctioned by the Korean Tour

European Tour playoff record (1–3)

Asian Tour wins (2)

*Note: The 2010 Ballantine's Championship was shortened to 54 holes due to bad weather.
1Co-sanctioned by the European Tour
2Co-sanctioned by the Korean Tour

Asian Tour playoff record (0–1)

PGA Tour of Australasia wins (1)

PGA Tour of Australasia playoff record (0–2)

Challenge Tour wins (3)

1Dual-ranking event with the European Tour

Challenge Tour playoff record (2–0)

Von Nida Tour wins (1)

Results in major championships

CUT = missed the half-way cut
"T" = tied

Results in World Golf Championships
Results not in chronological order before 2015.

QF, R16, R32, R64 = Round in which player lost in match play
"T" = tied
Note that the HSBC Champions did not become a WGC event until 2009.

Team appearances
Amateur
Nomura Cup (representing Australia): 2001 (winners)
Eisenhower Trophy (representing Australia): 2002 (individual leader)
Bonallack Trophy (representing Asia/Pacific): 2002 (winners)
Australian Men's Interstate Teams Matches (representing Victoria): 1999, 2000 (winner), 2001

References

External links

Marcus Fraser player profile, Golf Australia

Australian male golfers
PGA Tour of Australasia golfers
European Tour golfers
Asian Tour golfers
Olympic golfers of Australia
Golfers at the 2016 Summer Olympics
Sportsmen from New South Wales
Golfers from Melbourne
1978 births
Living people